The 2008 United States Senate election in Maine took place on November 4, 2008. Incumbent Republican U.S. Senator Susan Collins won re-election to a third term against Democrat Tom Allen, the U.S. Congressman from the 1st district.

Democratic primary

Candidates 
 Tom Allen, U.S. Representative
 Thomas Ledue, educator

Results

General election

Campaign 
Allen tried to tie Collins to George W. Bush, but these tactics failed as Collins maintained her image as a  very popular, moderate, independent Republican. She obtained an endorsement from Independent and former Democratic U.S. Senator Joe Lieberman.

When Collins was first elected in 1996 she pledged to serve only two terms (twelve years) in office, which would have been up in 2008. She instead decided to seek a third term, and defeated Allen with over 60% of the vote. She was the only Republican Senate candidate to win in 2008 in a state that was simultaneously won by Democratic presidential nominee Barack Obama.

Predictions

Polling

Results

See also 
 2008 United States Senate elections

References

External links 
 Elections Division from the Maine Secretary of State
 U.S. Congress candidates for Maine at Project Vote Smart
 Maine, U.S. Senate from CQ Politics
 Maine U.S. Senate from OurCampaigns.com
 Maine U.S. Senate race from 2008 Race Tracker
 Campaign contributions from OpenSecrets
 Collins vs Allen graph of multiple polls from Pollster.com
 ME-Sen: Baseline poll kos, DailyKos, October 22, 2007
 A Lopsided Senate Lineup  Charlie Cook, Cook Political January 20, 2007

2008
Maine
United States Senate